Portelance is a surname. Notable people with the surname include:

Arthur Portelance (1928–2008), Canadian businessman and politician
George Portelance (1931–1952), Canadian swimmer
Louis Roy Portelance (1764–1838), Canadian businessman and politician
Luc Portelance, Canada Border Services Agency president and Canadian Security Intelligence Service officer
Steven Granados-Portelance, Canadian drag queen